Wireless LAN is a computer network that links devices using wireless communication within a limited area.

WLAN may also refer to:

 WLAN-Hotspot, also known as a wireless hotspot
 WLAN (AM), a radio station in Lancaster, Pennsylvania
 WLAN-FM, a radio station in Lancaster, Pennsylvania